John J. Clerkin (born March 19, 1949) is an American politician who served as a member of the Vermont House of Representatives for the Windsor-6-2 Representative District from 2007 to 2011.

Early life and education
Clerkin was born in Woodsville, New Hampshire, in 1949. He earned a Bachelor of Arts degree from the University of Vermont in 1971 and a paralegal certificate from Woodbury College.

Career
Outide of politics, Clerkin worked as a real estate broker. He served as a member of the Hartford Select Board and as town manager of Hartland, Vermont, and Castleton, Vermont. He was elected to the Vermont House of Representatives in 2006 and served until 2007.

References

1949 births
Living people
Republican Party members of the Vermont House of Representatives

People from Woodsville, New Hampshire
People from Grafton County, New Hampshire
Vermont Republicans
University of Vermont alumni